The 2017–18 PlusLiga was the 82nd season of the Polish Volleyball Championship, the 18th season as a professional league organized by the Professional Volleyball League SA under the supervision of the Polish Volleyball Federation.

PGE Skra Bełchatów won their 9th title of the Polish Champions.

Regular season

Ranking system:
 Points
 Number of victories
 Set ratio
 Setpoint ratio
 H2H results

1st round

2nd round

3rd round

4th round

5th round

6th round

7th round

8th round

9th round

10th round

11th round

12th round

13th round

14th round

15th round

16th round

17th round

18th round

19th round

20th round

21st round

22nd round

23rd round

24th round

25th round

26th round

27th round

28th round

29th round

30th round

Playoffs

Quarterfinals
(to 2 victories)

Quarterfinal A
Quarterfinal B

Semifinals
(to 2 victories)

Semifinal A

Semifinal B

Finals
(to 2 victories)

Placement matches
(to 2 victories)

13th place
11th place

9th place

7th place

5th place

3rd place

Final standings

Squads

See also
 2017–18 CEV Champions League
 2017–18 CEV Cup

References

External links
 Official website 

PlusLiga
Poland
Plusliga
Plusliga
Plusliga
Plusliga